Marc Garellek is a Canadian linguist and Professor of Linguistics at the University of California, San Diego. He is known for his works on phonetics and laboratory phonology.

Select publications
Daland, R., Hayes, B., White, J., Garellek, M., Davis, A., & Norrmann, I. (2011). Explaining sonority projection effects. Phonology, 28(02), 197–234. doi:10.1017/S0952675711000145 
 Garellek, M., & Keating, P. (2011). The acoustic consequences of phonation and tone interactions in Jalapa Mazatec. Journal of the International Phonetic Association, 41(02), 185–205. doi:10.1017/S0025100311000193 
 Garellek, M. (2014). Voice quality strengthening and glottalization. Journal of Phonetics, 45, 106–113. doi:10.1016/j.wocn.2014.04.001 
 Garellek, Marc, Keating, Patricia, Esposito, Christina M., & Kreiman, Jody. (2013). Voice quality and tone identification in White Hmong. The Journal of the Acoustical Society of America, 133(2), 1078-1089

References

External links
Marc Garellek at UCSD

Phonologists
Living people
Linguists from the United States
Year of birth missing (living people)
University of California, Los Angeles alumni
University of California, San Diego faculty
Phoneticians
McGill University alumni
Linguists from Canada
Speech production researchers
Speech perception researchers